German submarine U-904 was a Type VIIC U-boat of Nazi Germany's Kriegsmarine during World War II.

She was ordered on 16 July 1942, and was laid down on 10 September 1942 at Flender Werke AG, Lübeck, as yard number 330. She was launched on 7 August 1943 and commissioned under the command of Leutnant zur See Detlev Fritz on 25 September 1943.

Design
German Type VIIC submarines were preceded by the shorter Type VIIB submarines. U-904 had a displacement of  when at the surface and  while submerged. She had two shafts and two  propellers.

U-904 was fitted with five  torpedo tubes (four fitted at the bow and one at the stern), fourteen torpedoes or 26 TMA mines, one  SK C/35 naval gun, (220 rounds), one  Flak M42 and two twin  C/30 anti-aircraft guns. The boat had a complement of between 44 — 52 men.

Service history
On 4 May 1945, U-904 was scuttled at the U-boat base in Eckernförde.

References

Bibliography

External links

German Type VIIC submarines
U-boats commissioned in 1943
World War II submarines of Germany
Ships built in Lübeck
1943 ships
Operation Regenbogen (U-boat)
Maritime incidents in May 1945